The Sabah Chinese Association (SCA) was a Chinese political party in the North Borneo and the Sabah state of Malaysia.

History
The party was established in October 1962 as Borneo Utara National Party, a merger of the United Party and the Democratic Party after encouragement from the Malayan Chinese Association.  Both parties had been founded earlier in the year; the United Party by Khoo Siak Chew in Sandakan and the Democratic Party by Peter Chin in Jesselton. It was later renamed the Sabah National Party, before becoming the Sabah Chinese Association in 1965 when it merged with a non-political organisation by the same name.

SCA's Peter Lo Sui Yin was the second Chief Minister of Sabah from 1965 to 1967.

Following the merger, the new party contested the local elections in an alliance with the United Sabah National Organisation and the United Pasokmomogun Kadazan Organisation. It won five seats in the 1967 state elections, and three seats in the 1969 general elections, and retained all three in the 1974 general elections, in which it was part of the Barisan Nasional. However, it failed to win a seat in the 1976 state elections, defeated by the Sabah People's United Front in every seat it contested; following the defeat, it was dissolved.

Election results

General elections

State elections

References

Defunct political parties in Sabah
1962 establishments in North Borneo
Political parties established in 1962
Political parties with year of disestablishment missing